Raakilipaatu is a 2007 Malayalam film starring Jyothika, Sharbani Mukherjee, Tabu and Lakshmi. The music was composed by Vidyasagar. The film was directed by Priyadarshan.The film's story is loosely based on the 1999 Marathi film Bindhaast written by Chandrakant Kulkarni. The film had a delayed release in 2007 and was shot in Tamil as Snegithiye (2000).

Plot
Best friends Josephine and Radhika are carefree pranksters at a prestigious ladies' college. They stay up late, break rules and wreak havoc at their hostel, much to their lecturers' annoyance. They also form a rivalry against Gita, the college queen bee. Malathi, Radhika's aunt, wants her niece to complete her studies, so that she can take over her late parents' multi-million business. In order to straighten Radhika out, Malathi arranges for her to get married.

At this point, Josephine and Radhika are introduced to Gayathri, a fiercely independent and strong police officer and an alumnus of their college. During an event at the college, Gayathri explains how women in the country lose their independence and livelihood after getting married. Convinced that they should avoid marriage as long as possible, Josephine and Radhika pretend that Radhika has a boyfriend from overseas, named Ramesh, in order to avoid Malathi from arranging anymore suitors. However, this fantasy takes a whole new turn, when an actual person named Ramesh calls and sends Radhika letters, claiming to be her boyfriend. To end this nuisance, Josephine and Radhika invite Ramesh to their hostel during the college dance program and plan to trick him into blurt out the truth. Josephine instructs Radhika to bring her aunt's guns for their safety.

However, a mysterious shooter kills Ramesh before the girls can confront him. Fearing that suspicion would fall on them, they decide to dispose of the body by hiding it in the air ventilator. Unexpectedly, the body slides down the vent and lands on the auditorium stage, in the middle of a performance. Gayathri, who is the guest of honour at the event, takes charge of the case. She finds Radhika's necklace on the body and the two girls are brought in for questioning. At the police station, an old woman shows up claiming that Ramesh is her son and has gone missing. Realising that the noose is tightening and that the story of their innocence would not stand, Josephine and Radhika escape police custody and hide in an abandoned mansion, on the outskirts of the city.

Knowing that they are now the prime suspects of Ramesh's murder, they decide to find the real killer before Gayathri catches up on them. Josephine suspects Malathi of framing them in order to inherit Radhika's wealth. When they finally seise the chance to meet her, Malathi explains that she had known all along that the girls had been fooling her. The young man who was pretending to be Ramesh, was actually a family friend, named Vikram, whom Malathi had been planning to marry Radhika off to.

Through their college friends, the girls discover that Gita had gone missing on that fateful night. After much difficulty, the girls find Gita hiding in at a border town. However, Gita reveals that she too is on the run from Gayathri, because she had witnessed Gayathri killing Vikram [aka Ramesh] that night. On the night of the murder, she had returned to the hostel to take some medications and had inadvertently witnessed the murder and had fled from the scene, fearing Gayathri would use her influence to cover up the crime. Unfortunately, Gayathri manages to catch up on the trio. However, the woman who had pretended to be Ramesh's mother arrives on the scene. She turns out to be a CBI officer, who had been investigating Gayathri and knows that the girls are not responsible for Vikram's murder.

Gayathri ends up going insane because of her mental stress. The CBI officer reveals that Gayathri had murdered Vikram to avenge her sister's paralysis. Vikram and his friends had gang-raped Gayathri's sister in the past, after Gayathri found out he was a womaniser and stopped her sister from dating him. To escape justice, she had no choice, but to frame Josephine and Radhika as the murderers. The film concludes with Gayathri institutionalised at a mental asylum, where the three girls, now close friends, pay her a visit.

Cast

 Jyothika as Josephine (Josootty) ( Voice over By: Bhagyalakshmi)
 Sharbani Mukherjee as Radhika Menon
 Tabu as ACP Gayathri Varma               
 Ishita Arun as Geetha Damodaran
 Shweta Menon as police officer Jayashree
 Lakshmi as Malathi Menon (Radhika's aunt) (voice-over by Anandavally)
 K. P. A. C. Lalitha as Eliama Pothen (Josootty's mother)
 Major Ravi as Ramesh / Vikram 
 Mita Vasisht as Prema Narayanan, the undercover police officer
 Sukumari as the hostel warden and a history professor
 Shanthi Williams as the college principal
 Manasi Scott as Manasi, Josephine's friend
 Suchithra as Advocate Soumini
 Manju Pillai as a police constable
 Poornima Parameswaran as Kutti Paru
 Jomol as Savitri, Gayathri's sister 
 Deepti Bhatnagar in a special appearance
 Shari as Arundathi (cameo)
 Philomina as Vikram's neighbour (cameo)

Soundtrack

References

External links
 Metromatinee article
Bharatfamily article

2007 films
2000s Malayalam-language films
Films directed by Priyadarshan